Asteridiella selaginellae is a species of fungus in the family Meliolaceae, first described by Marie Leonore Farr in 1968. It  has been found in Mexico on the leaves of Selaginella pilifera (the resurrection plant).

References

Meliolaceae
Taxa described in 1968
Taxa named by Marie Leonore Farr